Okadaiidae is a family of sea slugs, dorid nudibranchs, marine gastropod mollusks in the superfamily Polyceroidea. This family is within the clade Euctenidiacea.

This family has no subfamilies.

Genera 
 Vayssierea (Risbec, 1928)
 Vayssierea felis (Collingwood, 1881)

References

External links

 Sea Slug Forum species list